The Platthorn is a mountain of the Swiss Pennine Alps, located south of Grächen in the canton of Valais. It lies north of the Färichhorn and the Balfrin, on the range between the Mattertal and the Saastal.

References

External links
Platthorn in Mountains for Everybody.
Platthorn on Hikr.

Mountains of the Alps
Alpine three-thousanders
Mountains of Valais
Mountains of Switzerland